Centrone is an Italian surname. Notable people with the surname include:

 Chris Centrone (born 1991), Italian rugby league footballer
 Pablo Centrone (born 1957), Argentine football manager

Italian-language surnames